Hohlbach may refer to:

 Hohlbach (Nidda), a river of Hesse, Germany, tributary of the Nidda
 Hohlbach (Haidenaab), a river of Bavaria, Germany, tributary of the Haidenaab
 Hohlbach, a former subdivision of the municipality Hollenegg, Deutschlandsberg District, Styria, Austria